National Highway 367A, commonly referred to as NH 367A is a national highway in India. It is a spur road of National Highway 67.  NH-367A runs in the state of Karnataka in India.

Route 
NH 367A connects Koppal city and  Metgal via Irkalgada of Koppal district in the state of Karnataka.

Junctions  
 
  Terminal near Koppal.
  Terminal near Metgal.

See also 
 List of National Highways in India
 List of National Highways in India by state

References

External links 

 NH 367A on OpenStreetMap

National highways in India
National Highways in Karnataka